Classical education may refer to:

Modern, educational practices and educational movements:
An education in the Classics, especially in Ancient Greek and Latin
Classical education movement, based on the trivium (grammar, logic, rhetoric) and quadrivium (astronomy, arithmetic, music and geometry)
Classical Christian education, an application of the classical education movement with an emphasis on the Christian faith
Classical Islamic education, see:
 Madrasah
Ijazah
Historical, educational practices and values:
Education in ancient Greece
Education in ancient Rome
The curriculum of the Middle Ages, see Medieval university
Classical Chinese education, see:
Imperial examination
Scholar-bureaucrats